Xiakou is a town under the administration of Jiangshan, Zhejiang, China. , it has one residential community and 18 villages under its administration.

References 

Township-level divisions of Zhejiang
Jiangshan